Miki Antony (born Michael Antony Derrick) is a British singer, composer, record producer and property developer.

Derrick, J. Vincent Edwards and Kris Ife began writing songs under the collective pseudonym Miki Antony, including "I Remember Natalie" recorded in 1968 by Bob Monkhouse (and arranged and co-produced by Mark Wirtz).  Derrick then changed his name by deed poll to Miki Antony, and began writing and performing in his own right.

His career in the music industry lasted approximately from 1969 to 1985. During that time he had several hit records, as a singer, writer, and record producer, both in United Kingdom and abroad. As a singer he had a UK top 30 hit with "If It Wasn't for the Reason that I Love You" (1973), and a follow-up with "Another Without You Day"; both were Greenaway/Cook songs and record productions. He wrote, produced, and sang several other minor hits both here and abroad including "Jack-a-Dandy" which was a number one in South Africa and Australia. His only LP was City of the Angels recorded in Los Angeles for EMI in 1978, which is a collection of all his best songs, many of which were covered by other artists. He also won the 1981 Castlebar Song Contest and came second both in the South American (Chile) and the Greek (XV1Olympiad).

As a writer, his songs have been recorded by MWD, The 5th Dimension, Vince Hill, Pat McGlynn, The Nolans, The Congregation - (million seller in US), Bob Monkhouse, The Goodies, Russ Abbot, Demis Roussos, Hot Gossip and Mary Mason. His disco library music was featured in all The Benny Hill Show and The Avengers TV series. Antony wrote the Dentyne chewing gum jingle that was featured in UK cinemas for 10 years. To date over 400 different songs of his have been recorded.

Antony's hit records were mainly record productions and included seven with the Goodies - including "Funky Gibbon" and "The Inbetweenies". Two platinum selling LPs in Japan with Pat McGlynn (Bay City Rollers) both went to No.1 - 16 songs were written by Antony.

His other credits include "Angel of the Morning" for Mary Mason (UK top 30 hit) and one other top 50 "Love Crusader" by Hot Gossip, which featured Sarah Brightman as lead singer. "I Remember Natalie" was top 20 in Germany for Vince Hill.

After leaving the music industry, he had a successful career as a property developer converting NHS hospitals into apartments and houses until he retired in 2001 to work from home in Windsor, and spend more time with his family. He continues to write songs and in 2010 "If You Never Have the Chance" got to the final of the UK Songwriting Contest.

References

External links
Official site

Year of birth missing (living people)
Living people
British male composers
English pop singers
British record producers
British songwriters
Castlebar Song Contest winners
British male songwriters